ISO 3166-2:GA is the entry for Gabon in ISO 3166-2, part of the ISO 3166 standard published by the International Organization for Standardization (ISO), which defines codes for the names of the principal subdivisions (e.g., provinces or states) of all countries coded in ISO 3166-1.

Currently for Gabon, ISO 3166-2 codes are defined for 9 provinces.

Each code consists of two parts, separated by a hyphen. The second part is a digit (1–9).

Current codes
Subdivision names are listed as in the ISO 3166-2 standard published by the ISO 3166 Maintenance Agency (ISO 3166/MA).

Click on the button in the header to sort each column.

See also
 Subdivisions of Gabon
 FIPS region codes of Gabon

External links
 ISO Online Browsing Platform: GA
 Provinces of Gabon, Statoids.com

2:GA
ISO 3166-2
Gabon geography-related lists